Pío Eko Ndong Obela (born 15 September 1998) is an Equatorial Guinean footballer who plays as a defender. He was a member of the Equatorial Guinea national team.

Club career
Eko is a Cano Sport Academy product.

International career
Eko made his international debut for Equatorial Guinea in 2018.

References

1998 births
Living people
Association football defenders
Association football midfielders
Equatoguinean footballers
People from Litoral (Equatorial Guinea)
Equatorial Guinea international footballers
Cano Sport Academy players
Divisiones Regionales de Fútbol players
Tercera División players
CD Cieza players
AD Alcorcón footballers
Equatoguinean expatriate footballers
Equatoguinean expatriate sportspeople in Spain
Expatriate footballers in Spain
Equatorial Guinea A' international footballers
2018 African Nations Championship players